Bad for Good: The Very Best of Scorpions is a compilation album by the German heavy metal band Scorpions, released in 2002 by Hip-O Records. The final two songs, "Cause I Love You" and the title track are new tracks and were written for the compilation.

Track listing

Personnel
Scorpions
Klaus Meine – vocals, backing vocals, whistling (track 11)
Rudolf Schenker - rhythm guitars, acoustic guitars, lead guitar [tracks 6 (outro), 7, 11 & 12], backing vocals
Matthias Jabs - lead guitars, rhythm guitars (tracks 6, 7, 11 & 12), acoustic guitars (track 12), slide guitars, talk box (tracks 3 & 17)
Michael Schenker – lead guitar (track 2)
Francis Buchholz - bass guitars, backing vocals (tracks 1-15)
Ralph Rieckermann - bass guitars, backing vocals (tracks 16-18)
Herman Rarebell - drums, backing vocals (tracks 1-16)
James Kottak - drums, backing vocals (tracks 17 & 18)

Additional musicians
Lee Aaron - backing vocals (track 9)
Koen van Baal, Robbie Buchanan - keyboards (track 11)
Jim Vallance - keyboards (track 12)

References

Scorpions (band) compilation albums
2002 compilation albums
Hip-O Records compilation albums